Sertan Saltan is a Denmark based Turkish artist whose work was acclaimed by international media after his winning of the BP Young Artist Award in 2011
 He was born in Eskişehir, Turkey on 17 September 1982. He was publicized as the 'Best young artist of England' by the Turkish media such as Sabah (newspaper) and 'Dogan Haber Ajansi' a major news agency in Turkey. His work focuses on portraits, typically using oils as the primary media. He studied painting with Teymur Rzayev, a naturalistic painter, at his atelier in Istanbul before moving to the United States in 2006 to continue his studies at State University of New York where he attained a Bachelor of Fine Arts degree. His work has been influenced by both Eastern and Western cultures. Mr. Saltan had several exhibitions in Turkey and the UK.

Most recently he won the 'Young Artist Award' overall in the 2011 BP Portrait Award which is given to the top talented artists in their field  from 2372 entries.
He was also honored by the Commander of the Turkish Navy for his contributions to the naval exhibition in 2006.

Public exhibitions
 BP Portrait Award, The National Portrait Gallery, London, 2011,
Wolverhampton Art Gallery, Wolverhampton, 2011
Aberdeen Art Gallery, Aberdeen, 2011-2012
Istanbul Naval Museum, Istanbul, 2006

References

External links
Official website

1982 births
Living people
Portrait painters
Turkish painters
State University of New York alumni
People from Eskişehir